Ivory Latta (born September 25, 1984) is an American professional basketball player who is currently a free agent. She was drafted 11th overall by the Detroit Shock in the 2007 WNBA Draft. A 5'6" (1.68 m) guard noted for her three-point shooting and on-court enthusiasm, she played college basketball for the North Carolina Tar Heels. She is the all-time leading scorer in South Carolina high school basketball history (men's and women's) with a total of 4,319 career points.

High school
Born in McConnells, South Carolina, Latta played for York Comprehensive High School in York, South Carolina, where she was named a WBCA All-American. She participated in the 2003 WBCA High School All-America Game where she scored seventeen points, and earned MVP honors.

College career
Latta was named the 2006 Player of the Year by ESPN.com, USBWA, GballMag.com and Basketball Times National Player of the Year, Nancy Lieberman Award Winner as Point Guard of the Year (2006), Consensus All-American (2006), ACC Player of the Year (2006), ACC Tournament MVP (2005), WBCA National Player for the Month of March (2005), All-ACC First Team (2007, 2005), AP All-American Third Team (2005), ACC Preseason Rookie of the Year (2004), All-ACC Second Team (2004), All-ACC Freshmen Team (2004). Latta averaged 14.0 points per game as a freshman, 16.2 as a senior, and 16.6 for her career at North Carolina.

College statistics
Source

Professional career 
Latta was drafted by the Detroit Shock with the 11th pick in the 2007 WNBA Draft. She averaged 3.0 points per game as a rookie, and had the second-best 3-point field goal percentage in the WNBA for the 2007 regular season. Latta appeared in her first WNBA Finals during her rookie season with the Shock, where they lost in 5 games to the Phoenix Mercury. On February 6, 2008, Latta was traded to the Atlanta Dream for the Dream's 2008 second round pick and LaToya Thomas. She played for Ceyhan in Turkey during the 2008–09 WNBA off-season.  She was originally released by the Atlanta Dream at the start of the 2009 WNBA season, but then signed on July 3, 2009, after the Dream released Nikki Teasley instead.

Latta played for the Tulsa Shock from 2010 to 2012, and joined the Washington Mystics in 2013. In 2013, she was selected to the WNBA All-Star Game for the first time. In 2014, Latta was selected as an all-star replacement for the injured Elena Delle Donne, making it her second all-star game appearance.

In July 2016, Latta suffered a left knee injury during practice at the Verizon Center that would sideline her for the rest of the season after playing 22 games.

In 2017, Latta was healthy and played all 34 games. The Mystics advanced past the second round for the first time in franchise history, but were swept by the Minnesota Lynx in the semi-finals.

WNBA career statistics

Regular season

|-
| style="text-align:left;"| 2007
| style="text-align:left;"| Detroit
| 31 || 1 || 7.1 || .391 || .449 || .429 || 0.6 || 0.6 || 0.2 || 0.0 || 0.5 || 3.0
|-
| style="text-align:left;"| 2008
| style="text-align:left;"| Atlanta
| 34 || 31 || 28.2 || .362|| .344 || .802 || 2.1 || 3.6 || 1.3 || 0.0 || 1.7 || 11.4
|-
| style="text-align:left;"| 2009
| style="text-align:left;"| Atlanta
| 24 || 0 || 14.6 || .409 || .360 || .826 || 0.7 || 1.4 || 0.5 || 0.0 || 1.0 || 6.1
|-
| style="text-align:left;"| 2010
| style="text-align:left;"| Tulsa
| 18 || 16 || 28.7 || .422 || .370 || .776 || 1.4 || 3.9 || 1.0 || 0.1 || 2.1 || 12.4
|-
| style="text-align:left;"| 2011
| style="text-align:left;"| Tulsa
| 24 || 24 || 28.5 || .414 || .351 || .830 || 2.0 || 3.2 || 1.2 || 0.0 || 2.8 || 12.2
|-
| style="text-align:left;"| 2012
| style="text-align:left;"| Tulsa
| 34 || 18 || 28.3 || .430 || .390 || .840 || 2.2 || 3.3 || 0.9 || 0.0 || 2.1 || 14.3
|-
| style="text-align:left;"| 2013
| style="text-align:left;"| Washington
| 34 || 34 || 31.5 || .392 || .396 || .902 || 2.6 || 4.4 || 0.8 || 0.0 || 1.8 || 13.9
|-
| style="text-align:left;"| 2014
| style="text-align:left;"| Washington
| 34 || 33 || 31.7 || .395 || .377 || .833 || 2.4 || 3.3 || 0.7 || 0.0 || 1.9 || 12.8
|-
| style="text-align:left;"| 2015
| style="text-align:left;"| Washington
| 34 || 25 || 27.3 || .406 || .389 || .909 || 1.8 || 2.6 || 0.6 || 0.0 || 1.7 || 13.4
|-
| style="text-align:left;"| 2016
| style="text-align:left;"| Washington
| 22 || 2 || 20.8 || .331 || .305 || .909 || 1.7 || 1.9 || 0.3 || 0.0 || 1.4 || 8.3
|-
| style="text-align:left;"| 2017
| style="text-align:left;"| Washington
| 34 || 1 || 17.0 || .349 || .328 || .871  || 0.8 || 1.7 || 0.4 || 0.0 || 0.8 || 8.0
|-
| style="text-align:left;"| Career
| style="text-align:left;"|11 years, 4 teams
| 323 || 185 || 24.2 || .393 || .369 || .848 || 1.7 || 2.7 || 0.8 || 0.0 || 1.7 || 10.7

Playoffs

|-
| style="text-align:left;"| 2007
| style="text-align:left;"| Detroit
| 10 || 0 || 4.7 || .263 || .333 || .667 || 0.3 || 0.3 || 0.2 || 0.0 || 0.2 || 1.9
|-
| style="text-align:left;"| 2009
| style="text-align:left;"| Atlanta
| 2 || 2 || 37.5 || .400 || .333 || .889 || 2.0 || 2.5 || 0.5 || 0.0 || 1.5 || 13.5
|-
| style="text-align:left;"| 2013
| style="text-align:left;"| Washington
| 3 || 3 || 31.3 || .484 || .400 || .500 || 4.0 || 3.0 || 0.6 || 0.0 || 2.0 || 12.7
|-
| style="text-align:left;"| 2014
| style="text-align:left;"| Washington
| 2 || 2 || 37.1 || .357 || .333 || 1.000 || 1.5 || 4.5 || 0.5 || 0.0 || 3.0 || 17.0
|-
| style="text-align:left;"| 2015
| style="text-align:left;"| Washington
| 3 || 3 || 31.5 || .400 || .524 || .818 || 1.3 || 4.3 || 1.0 || 0.0 || 1.3 || 16.0
|-
| style="text-align:left;"| 2017
| style="text-align:left;"| Washington
| 3 || 0 || 9.2 || .467 || .444 || .000 || 0.7 || 0.7 || 0.0|| 0.0 || 0.3 || 6.0
|-
| style="text-align:left;"| Career
| style="text-align:left;"|6 years, 3 teams
| 23 || 10 || 17.9 || .399 || .402 || .795 || 1.2 || 1.8 || 0.4 || 0.0 || 1.0 || 8.0

European career
2007–2008:  Elitzur Holon
2008–2009:  Ceyhan Belediyesi
2009–2010:  Mersin BŞB
2010–2011:  Maccabi Ramat Hen
2011–2012:  Tarsus Belediye
2013:  Maccabi Ramat Hen
2015–2016:  Edirne Belediyesi Edirnespor

Personal life
On January 9, 2003 a resolution was read on the floor of the U.S. House of Representatives by U.S. Representative John Spratt honoring Latta. She would also receive the key to the city of York, South Carolina (where she attended high school and Spratt's hometown), which celebrated Ivory Latta Day on January 10, 2003.

Latta's father and paternal grandmother both live with Parkinson's disease and she has been very outspoken about how her father's diagnosis impacted her.  As a result, Latta serves as an ambassador for the Parkinson's Disease Foundation (PDF).  In this role, she is involved with fundraising campaigns for PDF and generating awareness about Parkinson's disease, and enlists other professional athletes to support the cause.

Latta's friendships with NBA superstar LeBron James and actor/rapper Chris "Ludacris" Bridges have been well documented.

Awards and honors
 2006 – Nancy Lieberman Award

Notes

External links 
 WNBA profile

1984 births
Living people
African-American basketball players
All-American college women's basketball players
American expatriate basketball people in Israel
American expatriate basketball people in Turkey
American women's basketball coaches
American women's basketball players
Atlanta Dream players
Basketball players from South Carolina
Detroit Shock players
McDonald's High School All-Americans
Mersin Büyükşehir Belediyesi women's basketball players
North Carolina Tar Heels women's basketball coaches
North Carolina Tar Heels women's basketball players
Parade High School All-Americans (girls' basketball)
People from York County, South Carolina
Point guards
Tulsa Shock players
Washington Mystics players
Women's National Basketball Association All-Stars
21st-century African-American sportspeople
21st-century African-American women
20th-century African-American people
20th-century African-American women